Górnośląski Klub Sportowy (GKS) Tychy is a Polish ice hockey team from Tychy which current plays in the Polska Hokej Liga, the highest professional ice hockey league in the country.

The club was founded April 20, 1971. GKS Tychy is a four-time Polish champion - 2005, 2015, 2018 and 2019. The club has also won eight Polish Cup titles, in 2001, 2006-2009, 2014, 2016 and 2017, making them the first Polish team to win the Cup three years in a row and to have nerver lost a Polish Cup final. Furthermore, GKS Tychy is the first Polish club who won a medal of European Cup with a third place in 2016 Continental Cup.
Stadion Zimowy, the home arena of GKS Tychy, has a capacity of 2,753 seats.

Players

John Murray

Jakub Zawalski

Denis Akimoto

Bartosz Ciura

Alexander Yeronov

Adam Baginski

Mike Cichy

Gleb Klimenko

Christian Mroczkowski

Alex Szczechura

Mike Szmatula

Alexei Yefimenko

Major achievements
Polish Championships 
 Winners (4): 2005, 2015, 2018, 2019
 Runners-up (9): 1988, 2006, 2007, 2008, 2009, 2011, 2014, 2016, 2017
 Third place (6): 1981, 1983, 2002, 2004, 2010, 2013
 Polish Cup 
 Winners (8): 2001, 2006, 2007, 2008, 2009, 2014, 2016, 2017
 Polish SuperCup 
 Winners (2): 2015, 2018
 Finalist (1): 2017
 IIHF Continental Cup
 Third place (1): 2016

Famous players
 Henryk Gruth
 Krzysztof Oliwa
 Mariusz Czerkawski
 Michał Garbocz

External links
  
 Polska Hokej Liga: PHL Tabela

Ice hockey teams in Poland
Sport in Tychy